Choptank-Upon-The-Hill is a historic home located near Middletown, New Castle County, Delaware.  It was built about 1820, and is a -story, five-bay, brick house with a -story brick ell. The addition was built about 1840–50. The house features a Palladian window above the front facade, a gable roof with dormers, and interior gable end chimney piles.

It was listed on the National Register of Historic Places in 1985.

References

Houses on the National Register of Historic Places in Delaware
Houses completed in 1820
Houses in New Castle County, Delaware
National Register of Historic Places in New Castle County, Delaware